Gord Bamford is a Canadian country music artist. His discography comprises eight studio albums and thirty-nine singles. He has accumulated seventeen top ten hits on the Canada Country airplay chart, including two number one singles.

Studio albums

2000s

2010s

2020s

Singles

1990s–2000s

2010s

2020s

Guest singles

Other charted songs

Music videos

References

Discographies of Canadian artists
Country music discographies